The IPSC Pan-American Shotgun Championship is an IPSC level 4 championship hosted every third year in either North- or South America, usually in the U.S. State of Kentucky.

History 
 2010 Kentucky, United States
 2013 Kentucky, United States

Champions 
The following is a list of current and past IPSC Pan-American Shotgun Champions.

Overall category

Lady category

Junior category

Senior category

Super Senior category

References

 IPSC Continental Championships
 Match Results - 2010 IPSC Pan-American Shotgun Championship, United States
 Match Results - 2013 IPSC Pan American Shotgun Championship, United States

IPSC shooting competitions
Shooting sports in North America
Shooting sports in South America
Sports competitions in the Americas